Love Me may refer to:

Albums 
 Love Me (Jeanne Pruett album) (1972)
 Love Me, a 1984 Jackie Chan album, or its title track
 Love Me (Danson Tang album) (2007)
 Love Me (J Peezy album) (2008)
 Love Me (Lee Jung Hyun album) (2008)

Songs 
 "Love Me", a song sung by Lee Patrick from the film Footsteps in the Dark (1941)
 "Love Me", a song by Fats Domino (1954)
 "Love Me" (Leiber/Stoller song) (1954), popularized by Elvis Presley (1956)
 "Love Me" (Buddy Holly song) (1956)
 "Love Me", a song by Diana Ross from Last Time I Saw Him (1973)
 "Love Me", a song by Bow Wow Wow from When the Going Gets Tough, the Tough Get Going (1983)
 "Love Me" (112 song) (1998)
 "Love Me" (The 1975 song) (2015)
 "Love Me" (Bee Gees song) (1976), popularized by Yvonne Elliman (1976)
 "Love Me" (Justin Bieber song) (2009)
 "Love Me" (Lena Meyer-Landrut song) (2010)
 "Love Me" (Lil Tecca song) (2018)
 "Love Me" (Lil Wayne song) (2013)
 "Love Me" (Stooshe song) (2012)
 "Love Me" (Tracie Spencer song) (1992)
 "Love, Me", a song by Collin Raye (1991)
 "Love Me", a song by Eminem featuring Obie Trice and 50 Cent from 8 Mile: Music from and Inspired by the Motion Picture (2002)
 "Love Me", a song by Katy Perry from Prism (2013)
 "Love Me", a song by The Phantom (Jerry Lott) (1960)
 "Love Me", a song by Jess Glynne from I Cry When I Laugh (2015)
 "Love Me", a song by W24 from Singing Dancing (2018)

Film 
 Love Me!, a 1986 Swedish film
 Love Me (1918 film), a film starring Dorothy Dalton
 Love Me (1942 film), a German film directed by Harald Braun 
 Love Me (2000 film), a French film directed by Laetitia Masson
 Love Me (2012 film), a film featuring Jean-Luc Bilodeau

Other 
 Love Me (Australian TV series), a 2021 Australian TV series
 Love Me, a 2003 novel by Garrison Keillor
 LOVE ME, a 2016 concert installation by Nico Sauer

See also 
 You Love Me, by the Meat Puppets (1999)
 "You Love Me", a song by Kelly Clarkson from Stronger (2011)
 "I Love Me", a song by Meghan Trainor from Thank You (2016)